Mimetus hesperus is a species of pirate spider in the family Mimetidae. It is found in the United States.

References

Mimetidae
Articles created by Qbugbot
Spiders described in 1923